Time Tears Down is the first full-length studio album by the German melodic death metal band Parasite Inc. It was released on 2 August 2013 via Good Damn Records (now Rebel Tune Records).

Background 
Time Tears Down was recorded in the band's own recording-studio. Sound engineering and mixing was done by the band itself. The album was mastered by Jens Bogren in the Fascination Street Studios. The band re-recorded all eight songs from their 2010 demo album for this album with the exception of the intro and an interlude. The bonus song "Deadlife" was released on physical copies only and is the oldest song written by the band, although never released before.

Reception 
The album received positive reviews and high ratings by leading German metal magazines. It reached number 26 in the official German rock-metal charts and stayed several weeks in the top 30. The music video for the song "The Pulse of the Dead" on YouTube was also successful.

Track listing

Personnel

Parasite Inc. 
Kai Bigler – vocals, guitar
Benjamin Stelzer– drums
Kevin Sierra – guitar
Stefan Krämer– bass

Production 
 Mastering by Jens Bogren

References 

2013 debut albums
Parasite Inc. albums